The second season of the American animated television series SpongeBob SquarePants, created by Stephen Hillenburg, aired on Nickelodeon from October 20, 2000, to July 26, 2003, and consists of 20 half-hour episodes. The series chronicles the exploits and adventures of the title character and his various friends in the fictional underwater city of Bikini Bottom. The season was executive produced by series creator Hillenburg, who also acted as the showrunner.

During the season's run, SpongeBob SquarePants became Nickelodeon's  2 children's program, behind Rugrats. Nearly 40 percent of SpongeBobs audience of 2.2 million were aged 18 to 34. The show signed a marketing deal with Target Corporation and Burger King, expanding its merchandising, and SpongeBob's popularity translated well into sales figures. In 2002, the show was nominated at the Primetime Emmy Awards for Outstanding Children's Program. Tom Kenny and Mary Jo Catlett were individually nominated at the 29th Annie Awards for their voice performances as SpongeBob and Mrs. Puff, respectively. Peter Straus and Paul Tibbitt were also nominated at the ceremony for their work on the "Christmas Who?" special. The episodes "The Secret Box" and "Band Geeks" won at the 2002 Golden Reel Awards for Best Sound Editing in Television—Animation, while the episodes "Jellyfish Hunter" and "The Fry Cook Games" received a nomination for Best Sound Editing in Television Animation—Music category.

Several compilation DVDs that contained episodes from the season were released. The SpongeBob SquarePants: The Complete 2nd Season DVD was released in Region 1 on October 19, 2004, Region 2 on October 23, 2006, and Region 4 on November 30, 2006.

Production
The season aired on Nickelodeon, which is owned by Viacom, and was produced by United Plankton Pictures and Nickelodeon Animation Studio. The season's executive producer was series creator Stephen Hillenburg, who also functioned as the series' showrunner. During production of the previous season, Nickelodeon picked up a second season for SpongeBob SquarePants on August 31, 1999. The season premiered more than a year later, on October 20, 2000. Season production assistant Derek Iversen commented, "We hoped it would go one season. We hoped it would go two seasons. I figured you do the best you can and you hope."

In this season, production switched from cel animation, used during the first season, to digital ink and paint. Executive producer Paul Tibbitt, in 2009, said "The first season of SpongeBob was done the old-fashioned way on cells, and every cell had to be part-painted, left to dry, paint some other colours. It's still a time-consuming aspect of the process now, but the digital way of doing things means it doesn't take long to correct." The animation was handled overseas in South Korea at Rough Draft Studios. Animation directors credited with episodes in the second season included Sean Dempsey, Edgar Larrazabal, Larry Leichliter, Andrew Overtoom, Leonard Robinson, Frank Weiss, and Tom Yasumi. The season was storyboarded by Walt Dohrn, C.H. Greenblatt, Chris Headrick, Chuck Klein, Carson Kugler, Jay Lender, Caleb Meurer, Dan Povenmire, William "Bill" Reiss, Octavio Rodriguez, Jim Schumann, Aaron Springer, Paul Tibbitt, and Erik Wiese.

Episodes were written by a team of writers, which consisted of Dohrn, David Fain, Greenblatt, Mr. Lawrence, Lender, Mark O'Hare, Povenmire, William Reiss, Springer, Tibbitt, and Merriwether Williams. During the season, the writing staff used their individual childhood experiences as inspirations to come up with much of the story lines for individual episodes. For example, in the episode "Sailor Mouth", SpongeBob learns profanity. The idea for the episode was inspired by creative director Derek Drymon's experience "[when] I got in trouble for saying the f-word in front of my mother." Drymon said, "The scene where Patrick is running to Mr. Krabs to tattle, with SpongeBob chasing him, is pretty much how it happened in real life." The end of the episode, where Mr. Krabs uses more profanity than SpongeBob and Patrick, was also inspired "by the fact that my [Drymon's] mother has a sailor mouth herself." In "The Secret Box", SpongeBob wants to see what is inside Patrick's secret box. The idea came to Drymon because he too had a secret box as a child. Creator Hillenburg said, "[He] started telling us about it. We wanted to make fun of him and use it."

Cast

The second season featured Tom Kenny as the voice of the title character SpongeBob SquarePants and his pet snail Gary. SpongeBob's best friend, a starfish named Patrick Star, was voiced by Bill Fagerbakke, while Rodger Bumpass played the voice of Squidward Tentacles, an arrogant and ill-tempered octopus. Other members of the cast were Clancy Brown as Mr. Krabs, a miserly crab obsessed with money and SpongeBob's boss at the Krusty Krab; Mr. Lawrence as Plankton, a small green copepod and Mr. Krabs' business rival; Jill Talley as Karen, Plankton's sentient computer sidekick; Carolyn Lawrence as Sandy Cheeks, a squirrel from Texas; Mary Jo Catlett as Mrs. Puff, SpongeBob's boating school teacher; and Lori Alan as Pearl, a teenage whale who is Mr. Krabs' daughter.

Season two introduced various characters that would recur throughout the series. Mr. Krabs' mother, Mama Krabs, debuted in the episode "Sailor Mouth" and was voiced by writer Paul Tibbitt. However, voice actress Sirena Irwin overtook Tibbitt's role as the character reappeared in the fourth season episode "Enemy In-Law" in 2005. In the Christmas special "Christmas Who?", SpongeBob's voice actor, Tom Kenny, portrayed Patchy the Pirate, the president of the fictional SpongeBob SquarePants fan club, while series creator Hillenburg voiced the character of Potty the Parrot. After Hillenburg's departure from the show as showrunner in 2004, Tibbitt was given the role voicing Potty the Parrot.

In addition to the regular cast members, episodes feature guest voices from many ranges of professions, including actors, athletes, authors, musicians, and artists. American rock band Ween guest starred as themselves in "Your Shoe's Untied". The band performed "Loop de Loop", a song they wrote for the episode. Before SpongeBob SquarePants aired on television in 1999, Hillenburg had approached band guitarist Dean Ween to compose a song for the show. Dean Ween said "[Hillenburg] called me and told me [he] was a marine biologist who was starting a cartoon about underwater sea creatures and that The Mollusk was a big reference point for him creatively and would we like to do a song for the show." The band conceived the song and wrote it in about three minutes. Ween's 1997 song "Ocean Man" would also be used four years later during the end credits sequence in The SpongeBob SquarePants Movie, and as part of the film's soundtrack. In the episode "Bossy Boots", American band The Capsules performed the song "Bossy Boots", which was later released on SpongeBob SquarePants: The Yellow Album in 2005. In "Bubble Buddy", professional American surfer Corky Carroll made a vocal cameo as Grubby Grouper, a famous surfer. It also stars Brad Abrell as titular character Bubble Buddy. "Grandma's Kisses" features Marion Ross as SpongeBob's grandmother. She would reprise her role throughout the series, including the fifth-season episode "BlackJack". In the entry "Pre-Hibernation Week", where Sandy and SpongeBob play extreme sporting games, American heavy metal band Pantera appeared as themselves for a special musical performance. McHale's Navy actors Ernest Borgnine and Tim Conway returned in the episode "Mermaid Man and Barnacle Boy III", reprising their roles as Mermaid Man and Barnacle Boy, respectively. John Rhys-Davies also guest starred in the same episode as the heroes' nemesis, Man Ray. Brian Doyle-Murray reprised his role as the Flying Dutchman for "Your Shoe's Untied" and "Shanghaied". Various other characters were voiced by voice acting veterans Dee Bradley Baker, Thomas F. Wilson and Clea Lewis.

Reception
Since SpongeBob SquarePants made its debut in 1999, the show had flourished into Nickelodeon's number 2 children's program, after Rugrats. Nearly 40 percent of the show's audience of 2.2 million were aged 18 to 34. As a result, Nickelodeon moved the show from Saturday morning to a much more valuable timeslot: almost-prime time, appearing at 6 p.m., from Monday through Thursday. In 2001, Nickelodeon took the "Saturday-morning ratings crown" for the fourth straight season, grabbing a 4.8 rating/21 share (1.9 million viewers) in two- to eleven-year-olds, jumping 17% from the previous year.

SpongeBob SquarePants signed a marketing deal with Target Corporation and Burger King, expanding its merchandising. Furthermore, the popularity of SpongeBob translated well into sales figures. In 2002, SpongeBob SquarePants dolls sold at a rate of 75,000 per week, which was faster than Tickle Me Elmo dolls were selling at the time. Nickelodeon's parent company Viacom purposefully targeted women in Japan as a way of marketing the SpongeBob SquarePants brand. Skeptics initially doubted that SpongeBob could be popular in Japan, as the character's design is very different from popular designs for Hello Kitty and Pikachu, but SpongeBob has gained popularity in Japan among women. Ratings and merchandise sales showed SpongeBob SquarePants had caught on with parents and with the college audience. In a promotion, college-oriented website Music.com gave away 80,000 SpongeBob T-shirts, four times more than during a similar promotion for Comedy Central's South Park.

Like the first season, the second season received widespread critical acclaim from critics and fans. In 2002, the show itself was nominated at the Primetime Emmy Awards for Outstanding Children's Program. At the 29th Annie Awards, the series was nominated three times, including Outstanding Individual Achievement for Voice Acting by a Female and Male Performer in an Animated Television Production categories for Mary Jo Catlett for her role as Mrs. Puff in "No Free Rides" and Tom Kenny for his role as SpongeBob SquarePants in "Wormy", respectively. Peter Straus and Paul Tibbitt were nominated for Outstanding Individual Achievement for a Song in an Animated Production for their song "The Very First Christmas" that was featured in "Christmas Who?" In 2002, the episodes "The Secret Box" and "Band Geeks" won at the Golden Reel Awards for Best Sound Editing in Television—Animation, while the episodes "Jellyfish Hunter" and "The Fry Cook Games" received a nomination for Best Sound Editing in Television Animation—Music category.

In his review for The Spokesman-Review, Isamu Jordan said, "I'll be honest. I dig the little yellow dude who lives in a pineapple under the sea quite a bit for his absurdity À la Ren and Stimpy." He said that "season two is worth having in your or your kid's SpongeBob collection" given that the episodes "Krusty Love", "Squid's Day Off", and "Mermaidman and Barnacleboy III" are on the set. Jason Bovberg of the DVD Talk wrote that the season release is "recommended." He said "Let me state up front that I adore this show. I get a total kick out of watching it with my 4-year-old daughter. We laugh uproariously at SpongeBob's adventures and I'm helplessly reduced to a boy about her age as I beam and giggle at the screen." However, Bovberg called the included audio commentaries "downright boring." Various celebrities—including Lance Bass of 'N Sync, Will Ferrell of Saturday Night Live, singer-songwriter Tom Waits, and Jerry Lewis—admitted they were fans of the show.

During the 2001–02 television season, the Parents Television Council (PTC), a watchdog media group, named SpongeBob SquarePants among the best programs on cable television. However, according to a report titled Wolves in Sheep's Clothing, which documents the increase in potentially violent, profane, and sexual content in children's programming, the PTC and fans believed the episode "Sailor Mouth", which originally aired during the 2001–02 season, was an implicit attempt to promote and satirize use of profanity among children. The report cited a repeat broadcast of the episode from 2005 to prove its point that it promoted use of profanity among children. In a later report, several members of the PTC listed "Sailor Mouth" as an example of how levels of profane, sexual, and violent activity has increased in children's television programming. Nickelodeon, in response to the incident, said "It's sad and a little desperate that they stooped to literally putting profane language in the mouths of our characters to make a point. Has the FCC looked at this?" Richard Huff of the New York Daily News criticized the report for misinterpreting the episode over its intent to satirize profanity implicitly.

Episodes

The episodes are ordered below according to Nickelodeon's packaging order, and not their original production or broadcast order.

DVD release
The DVD boxset for season two was released by Paramount Home Entertainment and Nickelodeon in the United States and Canada on October 19, 2004, one year after the season had completed broadcast on television. The DVD release features bonus materials including audio commentaries, storyboards, and featurettes. In 2005, the DVD compilation was nominated at the 9th Golden Satellite Awards for Best Youth DVD, although did not win.

Notes

References

Bibliography

External links

 Season 2 at Metacritic

2000 American television seasons
2001 American television seasons
2002 American television seasons
2003 American television seasons
SpongeBob SquarePants seasons